Cornelius Corneliusen Schoonmaker (June 1745February 1796) was a United States representative from New York.

Life
Born in Shawangunk (now Wallkill), Ulster County, New York, he received a limited schooling, became a surveyor and was engaged in agricultural pursuits. He owned slaves. During the American Revolutionary War, he was a member of the committees of vigilance and safety. He was a member of the New York State Assembly (Ulster Co.) from 1777 to 1790 and was a member of the State Convention to ratify the U.S. Constitution in 1788. In April, 1790, Schoonmaker was elected to the 2nd United States Congress, holding office from March 4, 1791, to March 3, 1793. He was again a member of the State assembly in 1795.

Schoonmaker died in Shawangunk in February, 1796, and was interred in Old Shawangunk Churchyard at Bruynswick, in Shawangunk.

Congressman Marius Schoonmaker (1811–1894) was his grandson.

References

External links
 

1745 births
1796 deaths
People from Ulster County, New York
People of the Province of New York
Hoffman family
American people of Dutch descent
Anti-Administration Party members of the United States House of Representatives from New York (state)
Members of the New York State Assembly
American slave owners